The Waban Library Center is a  library located in a historic building at 1608 Beacon Street in Newton, Massachusetts. The building is a modest  1½ story Tudor Revival brick building, with a gabled slate roof and raised end walls.  A cross-gabled entry area projects from the center of the front facade.  It was designed by Densmore, LeClear & Robbins, and built in 1929 with funds raised by subscription from Newton's citizens. The building was listed on the National Register of Historic Places in 1990.
 		 	
Originally the Branch library of Newton Free Library was located here. In early 2009, it closed due to budgetary constraints, but re-opened in September 2009 as the Waban Library Center, a community-supported facility.

The Waban Library Center, independent from the Newton Free Library, is completely staffed by volunteers and supported by the community. Building upon its history as a village reading room, the Waban Library Center presents itself as a gateway for lifelong learning and as a hub for intellectual, cultural, social and physical enrichment. It operates on a non-profit financial model.

See also
 Plummer Memorial Library
 Newton Centre Branch Library
 National Register of Historic Places listings in Newton, Massachusetts

References

External links
Official website

Library buildings completed in 1929
National Register of Historic Places in Newton, Massachusetts
Libraries on the National Register of Historic Places in Massachusetts
Libraries in Newton, Massachusetts
Libraries in Middlesex County, Massachusetts
Former library buildings in the United States